Drop the Beat was a Canadian television series produced by Back Alley Film Productions, which aired on CBC Television in 2000 and 2001. A short-run dramatic series, the show was one of the first television series in the world centred around hip hop music and culture.

A spinoff of the earlier CBC teen drama series Straight Up, the show starred Mark Taylor as Jeff and Merwin Mondesir as Dennis, the hosts of a hip hop show on CIBJ-FM, a fictional campus radio station in Toronto, Ontario. Michie Mee also starred as Divine, a rapper who was part of Jeff and Dennis' crew, and Ingrid Veninger played the station manager. The supporting cast also included Arlene Duncan, Vanessa Ford, Jennifer Baxter, Jason Harrow, Shamann Williams and Omari Forrester.

The use of a campus radio station was a deliberate reflection of Canadian reality — until Toronto's Flow 93.5 hit the airwaves in early 2001, Canada did not have any radio stations dedicated specifically to urban music.

Production
As a tie-in to help promote emerging hip hop musicians, the series released a soundtrack album in conjunction with the first season, featuring artists such as Maestro Fresh Wes, Infinite, Frankie Ano, Bahamadia, Ja Rule, Black Child, Choclair, Rahzel, Jully Black and Erykah Badu.

The show was also released as one of the first "interactive" dramatic television series on WebTV. Viewers on that platform could call up character biographies, post messages on an interactive user forum, or buy the soundtrack album through embedded sales links.

Episode directors included John Greyson, Paul Fox, Daniel Grou, Eleanore Lindo, T. W. Peacocke, Frances-Anne Solomon and Sudz Sutherland.

Awards
The series received two Gemini Award nominations for Best Dramatic Series, at the 15th Gemini Awards in 2000 and at the 16th Gemini Awards in 2001. Sutherland received a nomination for Best Writing in a Drama Series in 2000 for the episode "Battle Royale", and Taylor received a nomination for Best Actor in a Drama Series in 2001.

Episodes

Season one

Season two

Soundtrack album
Saukrates, "Drop the Beat" (4:06)
Kardinal Offishall, "Husslin'" (3:43)
Ja Rule, Black Child and Caddillac Tah, "4 Life" (4:24)
Rahzel, Jully Black and Choclair, "What You Do to Me" (4:19)
Erykah Badu and Rahzel, "Southern Gul" (3:07)
Marvel, "Red Light District" (3:57)
Infinite, "Addicted" (3:36)
Common, "Dooinit" (4:12)
Rascalz, "C-IV" (3:18)
Bahamadia and Frankie Ano, "Droppin' Gems" (4:14)
Mathematik feat. Dub-Ill, "Illmath (Weapons)" (3:19)
Canibus, "100 Bars" (4:58)
Kardinal Offishall and Thrust, "The Chosen Are Few" (3:22)
Maestro and Infinite, "We Came Wid It" (3:24)
Ivana Santilli and Natcha, "New World" (4:21)
Lil' Troy feat. Fat Pat, Yungstar, Lil' Will, Big T and H.A.W.K., "Wanna Be a Baller" (5:55)

References

External links

 

CBC Television original programming
2000s Canadian drama television series
2000 Canadian television series debuts
2001 Canadian television series endings
Canadian television spin-offs
Black Canadian culture in Toronto
Television series by Alliance Atlantis
Television shows filmed in Toronto
Television series about radio
Television shows set in Toronto
Hip hop television
2000s Black Canadian television series
2000s college television series